Moscow State Aviation Technological University is a university in Moscow, Russia. The modern name of this university is «MATI» – Russian State University of Aviation Technology. It is named after the Russian aeronautics and rocketry pioneer Konstantin Eduardovich Tsiolkovskii.

The current name of "MATI" Russian State Technological University is "MAI" Moscow Aviation Institute

History

The university chronicle starts in 1932 with the foundation of Dirigible Engineering Educational Center attached to Civil Air Fleet (CAF) Ministry by joining Aircraft School of Leningrad Institute of CAF Engineers and Moscow Aviation Institute. In 1939 the center was reorganized into Moscow Institute of CAF Engineers and named after K.E. Tsiolkovsky.

Konstantin Eduardovitch Tsiolkovsky (1857–1935) was a great Russian scientist and inventor in the field of aerodynamics, aerospace engineering and the theory of aircraft, rockets and dirigible. He was a founder of contemporary astronautics. For the first time in the old-age Mankind's history K.Tsiolkovsky substantiated the possibility of applying rockets for interplanetary communications, showed the reasonable and rational ways of advancing astronautics and rocketry, made solutions of a number of important engineering problems in rocket designing and liquid fuel jet engines. So, Institute had honestly been credited to bear his name. On June 17, 1940, Moscow Institute of Aviation Technology (or shortly MATI) was established on the basis of the later. MATI attained the university status and name Moscow State Aviation Technology Institute – Russian State Technological University in 1992 – recognition of both the scale and quality of its courses.

Today the university is one of the leading Russian technical universities where highly skilled experts in the field of advanced materials and high technologies are trained. Among the university teaching staff there are Academicians of the Russian Academy of Sciences, Russian Engineering Academy, Russian Academy of Technological Sciences and Russian Academy of Natural Sciences. About 260 professors and Doctors of Sciences as well as more than 700 associate professors and Ph.D. scientists work at the university. University realizes the training according to the 24 specialties of higher professional education and trains researchers according to the 28 scientific specialties, carries out retraining of the specialists from industry and raising the level of their skill according to the various programs.

Only in 1991 MATI was opened to foreign students. More than 200 students from Great Britain, USA, Germany, South Korea, Turkey, India, Myanmar, Nepal, Kenya, Morocco, Oman, China, Iran and some other countries are studying at the university. University takes part in various international projects, carries out a student and scientific exchange with the universities of the US, Great Britain, Taiwan, China, South Korea.

On the 31st of March 2015 the Ministry of Education reorganized Moscow Aviation Institute by annexation of the Russian State Technological University named after Tsiolkovsky.

Cooperation with Khrunichev State Research and Production Space Center

Cooperation of MATI and Khrunichev State Research and Production Space Center (Khrunichev Space R&D Center – is a leader of national space industry) in the field of training of the specialists for aerospace industry, as well as scientific and research cooperation in development of new technology for space exploration has resulted in establishing MATI's branch at Khrunichev Space R&D Center. This MATI branch received the name "Aerospace University for Specialized Training". The main goal for establishing an aerospace university was specialized training of the specialists in the field of development and production of advanced aerospace technology using for this aim teaching, scientific and production experience of MATI and Khrunichev Space R&D Center.

The main fields of Aerospace University activity are the following:

 development of the educational programs for additional education in Aerospace Engineering;
 specialized training of the technical staff (engineers, technicians, etc.);
 teaching of the foreign students according to the specialized educational programs additional to the undergraduate, graduate and postgraduate programs in Aerospace Engineering
Short-term educational programs for foreign specialists from aerospace industry (similar program MATI in cooperation with Khrunichev Space R&D Center is carrying on in the frame of the Russian-Britain Project for additional training of the students and specialists in aerospace technologies).

Practical training and research straight at the real working places and Centre's research labs allow to expand an engineering outlook of the students and to familiarize them with the urgent problems, which exist in aerospace industry.

University structure

There are seven main faculties in the university:

 Faculty of Aerospace Technology
 Faculty of Aerospace Engineering and Technology
 Faculty of Avionics and Informational Systems
 Faculty of Material Science
 Faculty of Applied Mathematics, Mechanics and Computer Science
 Faculty of Economics and Ecology
 Faculty of Social Science

University partners

 Airbus
 BAE Systems
 Royal Navy
 Royal Airforce
 Kingston University
 Delft University of Technology
 ANSAN Technopark (South Korea)
 Seoul Sanggye Industrial Masters School (South Korea)
 Honam Professional College (South Korea)
 Zvezdny (Star City) Cosmonauts Training Centre
 CIAM - Central Institute of Aviation Motors
 All-Russian Institute Of Aviation Materials
 Air Launch Corporation
 Space Mission Control Centre (TsUP)
 Monino Aviation Museum
 Zvezda - Research, Development and Production Enterprise
 Design Bureau of Transport Machinery
 Vnukovo Airport
 Khrunichev Space Centre
 Salute - Moscow Machinery Enterprise
 Energomash

External links

"MATI" – Moscow State Aviation Technological University official website

Universities in Moscow
Technical universities and colleges in Russia
Aviation in the Soviet Union